Jean-François, baron de Bourgoing (20 November 1748 in Nevers – 20 July 1811 in Karlovy Vary) was a French diplomat, writer and translator. A commander of the Legion of Honour, he was also a corresponding member of the French Academy of Sciences, a member of the Copenhagen Academy of Sciences, the Royal Swedish Academy of Arts, a foreign member of the Royal Swedish Academy of Sciences from 1810, a knight then a baron de l'Empire, and a knight of the Swedish Order of the Polar Star.

Life

Youth

Ambassador to Spain

Louis XVI

French Revolution

Secretary to Louis XVI's legation in Spain

Negotiations at the camp of Figueres

Literary career

Return to diplomacy

Trotsky
Leon Trotsky wrote to Alfred Rosmer from Cádiz on 19 November 1916:

Notes and references

1748 births
1811 deaths
Ambassadors of France to Spain
Knights of the Order of the Polar Star
Members of the French Academy of Sciences
Barons of the First French Empire
Members of the Royal Swedish Academy of Sciences
Commandeurs of the Légion d'honneur
Burials at Père Lachaise Cemetery